Cristina Pérez may refer to:

Cristina Perez (judge) (born 1968), U.S. judge
Cristina Pérez (reporter) (born 1973), Argentine journalist
Cristina Pérez (athlete), Spanish Olympic hurdler